Arthur Campbell Watson (17 March 1884 – 16 January 1952) was an English cricketer active from 1913 to 1928 who played for Essex and Sussex. He was born in Newdigate, Surrey and died in Partridge Green, Sussex. He appeared in 106 first-class matches as a righthanded batsman who bowled right arm fast. He scored 2,724 runs with a highest score of 111 and took five wickets with a best performance of three for 42.

He is one of only four cricketers to have hit a six over the St Lawrence Lime.

Notes

1884 births
1952 deaths
English cricketers
Essex cricketers
Sussex cricketers
People from Mole Valley (district)